The UEFA Cup was a European association football competition contested from 1972 to 2009. In the 2009–10 season its name was changed to UEFA Europa League.

English manager Bill Nicholson led Tottenham Hotspur to victory in the inaugural final, an all-English encounter against Wolverhampton Wanderers. For the first 25 years of the competition, the final was contested over two legs, one at each club's stadium. In 1998, Luigi Simoni led Inter Milan to victory over Lazio in the competition's first single-legged final held at a neutral venue, the Parc des Princes in Paris.

Only seven managers have won the competition more than once. Unai Emery is a record four-time winner: he won three consecutive editions of the UEFA Europa League with Sevilla in 2014, 2015 and 2016, and a fourth title with Villarreal in 2021. Three-time winner Giovanni Trapattoni led Juventus to victory in 1977, Internazionale in 1991, and Juventus once again in 1993, and Luis Molowny led Real Madrid to consecutive wins in 1985 and 1986, as did fellow Spaniard Juande Ramos who managed Sevilla to victory in both the 2006 and 2007 UEFA Cup Finals. Rafael Benítez became the first manager to win the competition as both the UEFA Cup (in 2004) and as the UEFA Europa League (in 2013), a feat later achieved by José Mourinho, who won the UEFA Cup with Porto in 2003 and the UEFA Europa League with Manchester United in 2017. Diego Simeone won in 2012 and 2018, both times with Atlético Madrid.

Spanish managers have won the title twelve times. Recent finals have been dominated by Spanish managers, with seven wins between 2010 and 2022. Ten managers have won the title in charge of teams from a country other than their own; the most recent was Austrian Oliver Glasner, as manager of German club Eintracht Frankfurt.

By year

Managers with multiple titles

By nationality

This table lists the total number of titles won by managers of each nationality.

See also
 List of UEFA Cup and Europa League finals
 UEFA Cup and Europa League records and statistics

References

General

Specific

External links
UEFA Cup official history

managers

UEFA Cup